Abraham Lincoln's Clemency was a 1910 American film directed by Theodore Wharton and produced by Pathé Films. The plot revolves around US President Abraham Lincoln pardoning a hapless sentry who had fallen asleep while on duty during the height of the American Civil War. Due to the soldier's incompetence he is due to face the firing squad. However, his mother pleads with the President to save her son, which, as the title suggests, he does.  The film was a single reel in length.

See also
 List of American films of 1910

References

External links 

1910 films
American black-and-white films
American silent short films
Films directed by Theodore Wharton
Fictional depictions of Abraham Lincoln in film
1910s American films